Ventura Alvarado Aispuro (born August 16, 1992) is an American professional soccer player who plays as a center-back for Liga MX club Juárez.

Born in the U.S. to Mexican parents, Alvarado was eligible to represent the United States and Mexico national teams, but ultimately chose to play for the country of his birth. He represented his country at the 2015 CONCACAF Gold Cup.

Biography 
Son of Ventura Alvarado and Blanca Aispuro, both Mexicans. Ventura began playing soccer at the age of eight in Phoenix in the forward position. At the age of thirteen, in 2005, he went to play for the basic forces of Pachuca for a year without much success, for which he had to return to his place of origin. He was training hard and after six months they gave him the option of going to América or Morelia and finally he decided on Club América, staying in the basic forces in the containment position. One day, Ventura says, that a central defender was injured, they put him in and thanks to his height he won many balls from above and that's when he decided to stay as a central defender.

Club America 
Alvarado came to the basic forces of Club América in 2008 thanks to a coach named "Crocodile" Valdez, spending a few weeks on trial with the team and finally staying with it. He started in the Third Division team, moving to the Sub-17 in 2009, then he moved to the Second Division team in 2010 and in 2011 he reached the sub-20, being the undisputed starter, winning the Clausura 2012 sub-20 championship. In June 2012, Ventura played every minute in the Copa Libertadores sub-20, where he Club América finished as third place. Between 2012 and 2013 was when Alvarado began to get more involved with the first team, having minutes in the Copa MX. Miguel Herrera made his Ventura debut with América in the Clausura 2013, on February 16, 2013 in the Mx League against Toluca, entering the 86th minute by Raúl Jiménez at the Azteca Stadium. On February 19, Ventura scored his first goal on matchday 4 of the Copa Mx against Necaxa at 63'.

Necaxa 
For the Apertura 2013 tournament, Ventura Alvarado joined the Necaxa del Ascenso MX team, under the orders of D.T. Jaime Ordiales. He was loaned by America on loan in order to get more minutes and therefore more experience. Ventura did not start the team, however, he managed to earn a position game after game until he finally managed to start in some games and thus gained the experience that Club América was looking for.

Return to America from Loan 
On May 6, 2014, Ventura renewed his contract with América and for the Apertura 2014 tournament, Ventura returned to the Coapa team. In preseason he managed to play several minutes, even scoring a goal in one of them. His calls with the first team become more frequent, he wins minutes, plays ConcaChampions scoring on August 19, 2014 against Bayamón of Puerto Rico. For the start of the 2014 Apertura league, it was said that Paul Aguilar was injured, others said that he had a conflict with DT Antonio Mohamed for which he was separated from the squad, which led Ventura as a starter in those important games.  América managed to reach the final against Tigres winning 3-1 winning the title number 12, where Ventura played all the league matches as a lateral defense. In addition, Alvarado also became champion of the CONCACAF Champions League, beating Montreal 5-3 on April 29, 2015 at the hands of DT Gustavo Matosas. In December 2015, the team traveled to the Club World Cup based in Japan where they achieved a fifth place. On April 27, 2016, America became the two-time champion of the CONCACAF Champions League, beating Tigres 4-1 on aggregate.

Santos Laguna 
At the beginning of 2017 after being runner-up in the league with the América club in the Christmas final against Tigres which he was sent off being part of a massive brawl with Jose Arturo Rivas, he signed for the Coahuila team.

Club career
Raised in Phoenix, Arizona where he played youth soccer with Tuzos 93 at age 11, 12 and 13, Alvarado signed with Club América in 2008 as a teenager. He worked his way up the ranks in the América's academy, starting with the Tercera Division team, moving to the U-17 team in 2009–10, to the Segunda Division team in 2010–11, and to the U-20 team in the 2011–12 season. With the U-20 team, he was a regular in the squad that won the 2012 U-20 Clausura championship. In June 2012, he played every minute for Club América U-20 in the U-20 Copa Libertadores, where the team finished third.

Alvarado became involved with the first team in the 2012–13 season and made his debut in a Copa MX match in July. On February 16, 2013, he debuted in Liga MX, replacing Raúl Jiménez at 86 minutes. He was loaned to Necaxa for the 2013–14 season.

Alvarado returned to América for the 2014 Apertura and started both legs of the final as América won its 12th title.

On July 29, 2021, Alvarado signed with MLS side Inter Miami as a free agent. Following the 2021 season, Alvarado's contract option was declined by Miami.

International career

On March 22, 2015, Alvarado was summoned for the first time to the United States soccer team with a view to two friendly matches in Europe. Despite accepting the call of the American coach Jürgen Klinsmann, at that time, the soccer player still he could choose to officially represent either Mexico or the United States in the future. Alvarado made his debut for the United States on March 25, 2015, entering the second half in a friendly match against Denmark in which the Americans fell 3-2. He started for the first time with his team on April 15, 2015. 2015 in the 2-0 victory of the United States over Mexico.8 Alvarado was included in the preliminary roster for the 2015 Gold Cup, making this the first time he was called up to an official tournament. He was confirmed on the final 23-player roster on May 23, 2015. He was a starter in the first match of the tournament against Honduras, definitively linking his international career to the North American team after debuting in an official tournament with it.11 He was summoned to play the 2015 Concacaf Cup where Mexico defeated the United States and qualified for the 2017 FIFA Confederations Cup.

Originally eligible for both his native United States and Mexico via his Mexican parents, Alvarado expressed interest in both national teams. Ultimately, he debuted for the United States in a 3–2 loss against Denmark on March 25, 2015. He was cap tied to the United States on July 7, 2015, when he started the opening match of the 2015 CONCACAF Gold Cup versus Honduras.

Honors
América
Liga MX: Clausura 2013, Apertura 2014
CONCACAF Champions League: 2014–15, 2015–16

Santos Laguna
Liga MX: Clausura 2018

Necaxa
Copa MX: Clausura 2018
Supercopa MX: 2018

References

External links
 
 
 
 
 
 
 

1992 births
Living people
American soccer players
American expatriate soccer players
Club América footballers
Club Necaxa footballers
Santos Laguna footballers
Atlético San Luis footballers
Inter Miami CF players
American sportspeople of Mexican descent
Expatriate footballers in Mexico
Soccer players from Phoenix, Arizona
Liga MX players
American expatriate sportspeople in Mexico
Association football defenders
United States men's international soccer players
2015 CONCACAF Gold Cup players